Richard Loveridge (born 15 January 1963) is a former Australian rules footballer who played with Hawthorn in the Victorian Football League (VFL) during the 1980s.

Playing as a rover who was handy near goals, Loveridge was a regular member of the Hawthorn side and was a premiership player in 1983 and 1986.  The 1986 VFL season was Loveridge's best; he kicked a career high 26 goals and finished tenth in the Brownlow Medal count. At the end of the 1989 VFL season he announced his retirement from football.

Loveridge is a lawyer, having studied at the University of Melbourne.  He is a partner of Herbert Smith Freehills, and has served as a member of the AFL Tribunal for more than ten years.

In October 2020, Loveridge was appointed as Chair of the Ormond College Council. 

Loveridge is a keen surfer.  In 1999 he wrote a surfing guide, Surfing Victoria: The Ultimate Guide.

References

External links
 
 Hawksheadquartersprofile

1963 births
Living people
Hawthorn Football Club players
Hawthorn Football Club Premiership players
Australian rules footballers from Victoria (Australia)
People educated at Scotch College, Melbourne
Sportspeople from Brisbane
20th-century Australian lawyers
University of Melbourne alumni
Victorian State of Origin players
Two-time VFL/AFL Premiership players
21st-century Australian lawyers